The 2018 Adelaide 500 was a motor racing event held on the weekend of 2 to 4 March 2018 at the Adelaide Street Circuit in Adelaide, South Australia. It marked the twentieth running of the Adelaide 500 and was the first event of sixteen in the 2018 Supercars Championship. It comprised two races of 250 kilometres. Support races included the opening round of the 2018 Super2 Series, a series for older model Supercars  and the inaugural round of the new SuperUtes Series. 

Shane van Gisbergen won both Race 1 and Race 2, driving a Holden Commodore ZB for Triple Eight Race Engineering.

Results

Practice

Race 1

Qualifying

Top 10 Shootout

Race 

Notes
– Lee Holdsworth received a 5 second Time penalty for Careless Driving, causing contact with Garth Tander separating the Pit Lane from the Race Track at Pit Entry.
– Garth Tander received a 5 second Time penalty after being found guilty for the incident with Craig Lowndes and Cameron Waters.

Championship standings after Race 1 

Drivers Championship

Teams Championship

 Note: Only the top five positions are included for both sets of standings.

Race 2

Qualifying

Top 10 Shootout

Race 

Notes
– Jack Le Brocq received a 15 second Time penalty for crossing the chevron separating the Pit Lane from the Race Track at Pit Entry.

Championship standings after Race 2 

Drivers Championship

Teams Championship

 Note: Only the top five positions are included for both sets of standings.

References

External links

Adelaide 500
Adelaide 500
Clipsal 500
2010s in Adelaide